Itola railway station is a railway station on the Western Railway network in the state of Gujarat, India. Itola railway station is 18 km far away from Vadodara railway station. Many Passenger, MEMU trains halt here. 19015/16 Mumbai Central – Porbandar Saurashtra Express is only express train which halt at Itola railway station.

Nearby stations 

Kashipura Sarar is nearest railway station towards Mumbai, whereas Varnama is nearest railway station towards .

See also
 Vadodara district

References

Railway stations in Vadodara district
Vadodara railway division